Sam Gray (1 August 1880 – 25 April 1944) was an  Australian rules footballer who played with St Kilda in the Victorian Football League (VFL).

References

External links 

1880 births
1944 deaths
Australian rules footballers from Victoria (Australia)
St Kilda Football Club players